Éric Prat (born 14 March 1956) is a French actor. He appeared in more than ninety films since 1980.

Selected filmography

References

External links
 

1956 births
Living people
Male actors from Tokyo
French male film actors
French male television actors
20th-century French male actors
21st-century French male actors